The Javan surili (Presbytis comata) is a vulnerable species of Old World monkey endemic to the western half of Java, Indonesia, a biodiversity hotspot. Other common names by which it is known by include gray, grizzled or Sunda Island surili; grizzled or stripe-crested langur; Javan grizzled langur; grizzled, Java or Javan leaf monkey; langur gris.

There are two subspecies of the Javan surili:
 Presbytis comata comata - Occurs in western Java
 Presbytis comata fredericae - Occurs in central Java

This colobine species has a sacculated stomach to assist the breakdown in the cellulose from the leaves it feeds on. It has a small, slender face and tail, and large round stomachs. Its coloring ranges from dark gray to white. Leaf monkeys tend to be active during the day, spending up to 5 hours grooming themselves.

Distribution 

The Javan surili is found in the western half of Java, Indonesia. It ranges as far east as Mt. Lawu on the border with East Java. According to a recent study, this species is mostly confined to Sundaland due to changes in the geography, sea level and vegetation that occurred during the Pleistocene era, and partly due to the type of vegetation and soil there today. The Javan surili lives in primary and secondary lowland rainforests, with an altitudnal range of 2500 meters.

Ecology 

The Javan surili mostly consumes leaves, however, it will also consume flowers, fruits, and seeds. This species appears to be more folivorous than any other member of the genus Presbytis, with over 62% of its overall diet composed of young leaves and 6% of mature leaves.

Conservation 

This species is currently listed on the IUCN red list of vulnerable species because of habitat loss due to human activity. It is estimated that fewer than 1,000 exist today in their natural habitat and only 4% of their natural habitat remains. Most of the loss of its original habitat is due to the clearing of the rainforests in Indonesia. Only 4% of its original habitat remains and the population has decreased by at least 50% in the last ten years. Of the two subspecies of P. comata, the frediricae subspecies is among the rarest and most at risk for extinction, located in one of the most highly populated areas on the island and near an active volcano.

References 

Javan surili
Endemic fauna of Indonesia
Endemic fauna of Java
Fauna of Java
Primates of Indonesia
Endangered fauna of Asia
Javan surili
Taxa named by Anselme Gaëtan Desmarest